Commander George Washington Rodgers (October 30, 1822 – August 17, 1863) was an officer of the United States Navy.

Biography
Rodgers was born in Brooklyn, the son of Captain George Washington Rodgers (1787–1832) and Anna Maria Perry. His maternal grandfather was Christopher Raymond Perry and he came from a family with an extensive history in the Navy.

Rodgers was warranted midshipman in the Navy on April 30, 1836, and was promoted to passed midshipman on July 1, 1842. He served in the West Indies, Africa, and Mediterranean. During the Mexican–American War (1846–1848), Rodgers served in the Gulf of Mexico as acting master on the steamer Colonel and frigate . Rodgers served with the Coast Survey from 1849 to 1850 and was promoted to lieutenant on June 4, 1850. Rodgers was assigned to duty on the sloop  from 1851 to 1853.

In 1861 Rodgers became Commandant of Midshipmen at the United States Naval Academy, replacing his brother Christopher Raymond Perry Rodgers (1819–1892). Rodgers was promoted to commander on January 16, 1862.

Rodgers served in the West Indies enforcing the Union blockade against Confederate blockade runners. Rodgers commanded the ironclad monitor  in two unsuccessful attacks on Charleston Harbor, in October 1862 and on April 7, 1863, at the First Battle of Charleston Harbor. Rodgers was appointed chief of staff to Rear Admiral John A. Dahlgren on July 4, 1863, and "was distinguished for his bravery in the silencing of Fort Sumter and the batteries on Morris Island."

Rodgers was killed aboard the Catskill  on August 17, 1863, after a shot pierced the pilothouse while Rodgers commanded the attack on Fort Wagner in the Second Battle of Charleston Harbor.

References

1822 births
1863 deaths
United States Navy personnel of the Mexican–American War
Union Navy officers
People from Brooklyn
Perry family
Rodgers family
Union military personnel killed in the American Civil War